Prananath Patnaik (16 November 1905 – 5 October 1970) was an Indian politician and leader of Communist Party of India. He was Member at Orissa Legislative Assembly.

Biography
He got his B.A. from the  Kashi Vidya Pitha, Banaras. While reading in Ravenshaw College, Cuttack, he joined the national movement in 1930. He was imprisoned ten times during freedom struggle.
 
He was one of the pioneers of socialist movement of Odisha and when Congress Socialist Party was formed in the state in 1934, he became its first President.

The Communist Party of India Orissa unit formed on 1 April 1936 and he move in to it. Utkal Provincial Krushak Sangha formed in 1935, and it, subsequently, acted as a provincial branch of All India Kisan Sabha  formed in 1936 . He was the founder Kisan Movement in the State, and the leader of Praja Mandal movement.

As editor of Odia weekly Nua Dunia Patnaik visited USSR in 1964-65 as a member of Indian Journalist delegation.

He died on 5 October 1970.

Bibliography
Odia prose ‘Ashanta Kalira Sahitya, 
Geeta Sanskruti, 
Prabasare Odia Sanskruti, 
History of Communist movement in Odisha.

References

Communist Party of India politicians from Odisha
1905 births
1970 deaths